Best of Guy Clark is an album by American singer-songwriter Guy Clark, released in 1982.

Except for four tracks, it includes all of the songs released by Clark on his two albums on RCA. Both Old No. 1 and Texas Cookin' were re-issued on CD on the Camden label in 2001.

Track listing 
All songs by Guy Clark unless otherwise noted.
 "Rita Ballou"
 "L.A. Freeway"
 "She Ain't Goin' Nowhere"
 "That Old Time Feeling"
 "Texas, 1947"
 "Desperados Waiting for a Train"
 "Instant Coffee Blues"
 "A Nickel for the Fiddler"
 "Texas Cookin' "
 "Anyhow, I Love You"
 "Virginia's Real"
 "Broken Hearted People"
 "Black Haired Boy" (Guy Clark, Susanna Clark)
 "The Last Gunfighter Ballad "
 "Let Him Roll"
 "Like a Coat from the Cold"

Personnel 
 Guy Clark – vocals, guitar

References 

1982 greatest hits albums
Guy Clark compilation albums
RCA Records compilation albums